Steinbock or Alpine ibex is a species of wild goat living in the Alps.

Steinbock also may also refer to:
 Operation Steinbock, a 1944 Luftwaffe bombing raid against southern England
 Steinbock (icebreaker), a river icebreaker of the Wasser und Schifffahrtsamt

People with the surname
 Anthony Steinbock, American philosopher
 Bonnie Steinbock, American philosopher
 Eberhard Steinböck (fl. 1882–1912), Austrian Olympic sport shooter
 John Thomas Steinbock (1937-2010), American Roman Catholic Bishop of Fresno
 Otto Steinböck (1893–1969), Austrian zoologist

Fictional
 Wenceslas Steinbock, a character in Cousin Bette

See also
Steinbach (disambiguation)
Steinbok (disambiguation)